Tambourah, also spelled Tamboura, is a village located in Haut-Mbomou Prefecture, Central African Republic.

History 
On 19 January 2016, LRA fighters raided Tambourah and abducted 16 people. Consequently, the residents fled and sought refuge in Zemio.

In August 2016, ACTED rehabilitated the village's well.

Facility 
Tambourah has one health post.

References 

Populated places in Haut-Mbomou